Cuevas del Silvino is a limestone cave system in Guatemala. It is located at km 260 on the road connecting Guatemala City to Puerto Barrios, in the municipality of Morales in the department of Izabal.

The Silvino cave system was declared a national park in 1972.

References

National parks of Guatemala
Caves of Guatemala
Limestone caves
Protected areas established in 1972
Central American Atlantic moist forests